Tomás Adriano de León (born October 14, 1977, in Torreón, Coahuila) is a former Mexican football player who plays the role of goalkeeper. He played for Santos Laguna, Club León and Dorados de Sinaloa.

References

External links

1977 births
Living people
Footballers from Coahuila
Mexican footballers
Sportspeople from Torreón
Association football goalkeepers
Santos Laguna footballers
Dorados de Sinaloa footballers
Club León footballers
C.D. Veracruz footballers
La Piedad footballers